The 2004 Challenge Bell was a tennis tournament played on indoor carpet courts at the Club Avantage Multi-Sports in Quebec City in Canada that was part of Tier III of the 2004 WTA Tour. It was the 12th edition of the Challenge Bell, and was held from November 1 through November 7, 2004. Martina Suchá won the singles title.

Champions

Singles

 Martina Suchá def.  Abigail Spears, 7–5, 3–6, 6–2
It was Suchá's only title of the year and the 2nd of her career.

Doubles

 Carly Gullickson /  María Emilia Salerni def.  Els Callens /  Samantha Stosur, 7–5, 7–5
It was Gullickson's only title of the year and the 1st of her career. It was Salerni's only title of the year and the 2nd of her career.

External links
Official website

Challenge Bell
Tournoi de Québec
Challenge Bell
2000s in Quebec City